J. J. Wolf was the defending champion but lost in the semifinals to Stefan Kozlov.

Kozlov won the title after defeating Aleksandar Vukic 5–7, 6–3, 6–4 in the final.

Seeds

Draw

Finals

Top half

Bottom half

References

External links
Main draw
Qualifying draw

JSM Challenger of Champaign–Urbana - 1
2021 Singles